Yennsy Manuel Díaz (born November 15, 1996) is a Dominican professional baseball pitcher for the Sultanes de Monterrey of the Mexican League. He has played in Major League Baseball (MLB) for the Toronto Blue Jays and New York Mets.

Career

Toronto Blue Jays
Díaz signed with the Blue Jays as an international free agent on July 3, 2014. He began the 2015 season assigned to the Rookie-level Dominican Summer League Blue Jays, and was promoted to the Gulf Coast League Blue Jays for the final month of the season. In 56 total innings pitched, Díaz posted a 4–4 win–loss record, 2.88 earned run average (ERA), and 58 strikeouts. He played the entire 2016 season with the Rookie Advanced Bluefield Blue Jays, and went 4–6 with a 5.79 ERA and 48 strikeouts in 56 innings. Díaz made his full-season debut in 2017, pitching the year with the Class-A Lansing Lugnuts. In 77 innings, he pitched to a 5–2 record, 4.79 ERA, and 82 strikeouts.

Díaz began the 2018 campaign with Lansing, and was promoted to the Advanced-A Dunedin Blue Jays in late May. He would finish the season with a 10–5 record, 3.05 ERA, and 125 strikeouts in 147 innings. The Blue Jays added Díaz to their 40-man roster after the 2018 season to protect him from the Rule 5 draft.

He opened the 2019 season with the New Hampshire Fisher Cats. On August 3, the Blue Jays promoted Díaz to the major leagues. He was returned to New Hampshire  on August 5.

With the 2019 Toronto Blue Jays, Díaz appeared in 1 game, compiling a 0–0 record with 27.00 ERA and no strikeouts in 0.2 innings pitched. He spent the 2020 season at the Blue Jays alternate training site and did not play in a game for the big league club.

New York Mets
On January 27, 2021, Díaz was traded to the New York Mets alongside Sean Reid-Foley and Josh Winckowski in exchange for Steven Matz. Díaz  split the 2021 season with the Triple-A Syracuse Mets and the New York Mets. With Triple-A Syracuse, through 15 appearances, Díaz went 0–3 with a 6.75 ERA and 19 strikeouts. With the Major-league New York Mets, Díaz made 20 appearances, going 0–2 with a 5.40 ERA and 21 strikeouts.

On April 7, 2022, Díaz was designated for assignment by the Mets following the acquisition of Adonis Medina. He cleared waivers and was outrighted to Triple-A on April 11. He made 20 appearances for Triple-A Syracuse, working to an 0–2 record and 6.75 ERA with 22 strikeouts in 28.0 innings pitched. On August 8, Díaz was released by the Mets organization.

Sultanes de Monterrey
On February 20, 2023, Díaz signed with the Sultanes de Monterrey of the Mexican League.

References

External links

1994 births
Living people
Bluefield Blue Jays players
Dominican Republic expatriate baseball players in Canada
Dominican Republic expatriate baseball players in the United States
Dominican Summer League Blue Jays players
Dunedin Blue Jays players
Estrellas Orientales players
Gulf Coast Blue Jays players
Lansing Lugnuts players
Major League Baseball pitchers
Major League Baseball players from the Dominican Republic
New Hampshire Fisher Cats players
New York Mets players
People from Azua Province
Syracuse Mets players
Toronto Blue Jays players